The Bartram Trail follows the approximate route of 18th-century naturalist William Bartram’s southern journey from March 1773 to January 1777. Bartram explored much of the territory which is now the states of  North and South Carolina, Georgia, Florida, Alabama, Mississippi, Louisiana and Tennessee.

It has been designated as a National Recreation Trail in Georgia, North Carolina, and Alabama.

The Bartram Trail Conference, Inc., was founded in 1976 to identify and mark the route of Bartram’s southern explorations and to promote interest in developing recreational trails and botanical gardens along the route. The BTC also encourages the study, preservation and interpretation of the William Bartram heritage at both cultural and natural sites in Trail states.

The North Carolina Bartram Trail Society was organized in 1977. The Society reached an agreement with the U.S. Forest Service to mark the general trail corridor within the Nantahala National Forest, and to blaze and build the trail, which was completed. They conduct meetings in the Spring and Fall each year, and organize trail work hikes.

Georgia

After entering Georgia from North Carolina, the trail follows a ridge line to its highest point in Georgia at Rabun Bald
From there it passes Martin Creek Falls and Becky Branch Falls as it drops to go through Warwoman Dell. From Warwoman Dell, it climbs again before dropping to its lowest elevations along a stretch of the Wild and Scenic Chattooga River. In addition to a number of waterfalls like Martin Creek Falls and Becky Branch Falls and vistas from Rabun Bald, the Bartram Trail offers a great deal of scenic beauty.

The Georgia portion of the trail is entirely in the Chattooga River District of the Chattahoochee National Forest and is managed by the United States Forest Service.  The southern terminus of the Bartram Trail is at its intersection with Georgia State Route 28 at the South Carolina state line.

South Carolina
The trail connects into South Carolina along the Chattooga Trail, joining with the Foothills Trail, which is also a designated National Recreation Trail.

North Carolina

In North Carolina, the Bartram Trail meanders  near the mountainous towns of Franklin, Highlands, Andrews, Robbinsville, and Nantahala.  It includes  Wayah Bald, which is the highest point on the trail and where it crosses the Appalachian Trail.  There is an optional  canoe section on the Little Tennessee River.

Florida

The William Bartram Scenic & Historic Highway, named in honor of the botanist's travels in Florida, runs  along the east side of the St. Johns River from Jacksonville south to northwestern St. Johns County on State Road 13.

Bartram Trail High School at St. Johns, Florida (just south of Jacksonville) is named for the scenic highway and Bartram's  exploration route around the Northern St. Johns County area.

Alabama
It is operated by the Alabama Department of Conservation and offers canoeists and kayakers 13 different routes to choose from, including three routes with floating campsites. Named for William Bartram, it represents a small section of Bartram's travels by boat on the Mobile, Tensaw and Tombigbee Rivers in the summer of 1775.

The William Bartram Arboretum  is located within Fort Toulouse Park, near Wetumpka, Alabama and is named in honor of the 18th century naturalist, who visited the area in 1776.

See also
 List of Hiking Trails in Alabama

References

External links

GeorgiaTrails profile of the Bartram Trail in Georgia
Forest Service profile of the Bartram Trail in Georgia
GORP profile of the Bartram Trail in Georgia & North Carolina
Blue Ridge Bartram Trail Conservancy
Bartram Trail in Georgia and the Bartram Trail Guides
The Bartram Trail Conference, Inc. The Travels of William Bartram

 

Hiking trails in Alabama
Hiking trails in Florida
Hiking trails in Georgia (U.S. state)
National Recreation Trails in North Carolina
National Recreation Trails in Georgia (U.S. state)
National Recreation Trails in Alabama
Hiking trails in South Carolina
Protected areas of Rabun County, Georgia
Protected areas of Macon County, North Carolina
Protected areas of Swain County, North Carolina
Long-distance trails in the United States
Nantahala National Forest